José Frontera (born 31 January 1971) is a former Puerto Rican tennis player.

Frontera has a career high ATP singles ranking of world No. 1120 achieved on 16 September 1996. He also has a career high ATP doubles ranking of world No. 196 achieved on 7 February 2000.

Frontera has reached six career doubles finals, with a record of 3 wins and 3 losses including a 2–2 record in ATP Challenger Tour finals. He never managed to reach a final in singles.

ATP Challenger and ITF Futures finals

Doubles: 6 (3–3)

External links

1971 births
Living people
Puerto Rican male tennis players
Central American and Caribbean Games bronze medalists for Puerto Rico
Central American and Caribbean Games medalists in tennis